This List of Czech rail accidents contains those train wrecks which happened in the Czech Republic, including former territories which are now within the country.

List

References 

Czech Republic
!